Maiden of the Cancer Moon is a live album by American psychedelic rock band Quicksilver Messenger Service.

Track listing

Side One
"Back Door Man"
"Codine"
"Mona/Maiden of the Cancer Moon/Mona"

Side Two
"Gold and Silver"
"Smokestack Lightning"

Side Three
"Light Your Windows"
"Dino's Song"
"The Fool"

Side Four
"Who Do You Love?"
"Mona/Maiden of the Cancer Moon/Mona"

Personnel
 John Cipollinavocals, guitar
 Gary Duncanvocals, guitar
 David Freibergvocals, bass guitar, viola
 Greg Elmoredrums

References

Quicksilver Messenger Service albums
1983 live albums